Kristopher James "Kris" McCarthy (born 15 October 1979 in Mildura) is a retired Australian middle-distance runner who specialised in the 800 metres. He represented his country at the 2000 Summer Olympics without reaching the semifinals. He won the bronze medal in the event at the 2002 Commonwealth Games.

He has personal bests of 1:45.57 minutes in the 800 metres (Melbourne 2000) and 3:47.7 minutes in the 1500 metres (Melbourne 2003).

In 2017 he decided to play AFL Masters and won the Carrum Cowboys Masters Best & Fairest Award in his maiden year beating the unlucky Reynolds brothers, who finished 2nd and 3rd (respectively).

Competition record

References

1979 births
Living people
Australian male middle-distance runners
Athletes (track and field) at the 2000 Summer Olympics
Olympic athletes of Australia
Athletes (track and field) at the 2002 Commonwealth Games
Commonwealth Games medallists in athletics
People from Mildura
Commonwealth Games bronze medallists for Australia
Sportsmen from Victoria (Australia)
Medallists at the 2002 Commonwealth Games